"Like Me" is a song by the American rapper Lil Durk featuring the American singer Jeremih. It was released in the US on March 31, 2015, as the first single from the former's first studio album, Remember My Name (2015). The song was produced by Vinylz, Boi-1da and Allen Ritter and had a positive response from some critics. "Like Me" peaked at number 43 on the Billboard Hot R&B/Hip-Hop Songs chart. A music video directed by Eif Rivera was created for the single and released in April 2015.

Background
The song premiered on March 24, 2015, and was released for digital download on March 31.

Critical reception
"Like Me" received positive reviews from some music critics. Rick Florino of Artistdirect praised the vocal chemistry between Durk's no-frills, ear-grabbing lyrics and Jeremih's identifiable vocal tone throughout the song. Ernest Wilkins of Pitchfork Media praised Durk's use of Auto-Tune in his delivery of the song, calling it "a smooth entry into the pantheon of Sensitive Thug jams". Jake Jenkins of AbsolutePunk called it "a well executed R&B-leaning track" for its collaboration with Jeremih and exquisite use of Auto-Tune, writing that it "helps bring out some emotion in an otherwise, stoic, hard-shelled persona".

Music video
The music video for the song was directed by Eif Rivera and released on April 20, 2015. The video follows Durk pursuing a romantic relationship with a woman but his actions in a craps game lead him to being set up. Intercut are scenes of Durk and Jeremih on a rooftop in Chicago.

Remix
The official remix was released on September 5, 2015, and features the rappers Lil Wayne and Fetty Wap.

Track listing
Digital download (Explicit version)
"Like Me" (featuring Jeremih) – 3:58

Digital download (Clean version)
"Like Me" (featuring Jeremih) – 3:58

Charts

Certifications

References

2015 songs
2015 singles
Lil Durk songs
Jeremih songs
Def Jam Recordings singles
Songs written by Boi-1da
Song recordings produced by Vinylz
Songs written by Vinylz
Songs written by Lil Durk
Songs written by Jeremih
Songs written by Allen Ritter